St Austell Bethel is an electoral division of Cornwall in the United Kingdom and returns one member to sit on Cornwall Council. The current Councillor is Malcolm Brown, a Liberal Democrat.

Extent
St Austell Bethel covers the east side of St Austell, including Bethel and part of Holmbush (which is shared with the St Austell Bay division). The division covers 135 hectares in total.

Election results

2017 election

2013 election

2009 election

References

Electoral divisions of Cornwall Council
St Austell